The Opel Flextreme GT/E Concept was a grand tourer concept car manufactured by Opel and based on the powertrain of GM Voltec. It was a five-door 2+2 fastback coupé with rear suicide doors.

The Flextreme GT/E premiered at the 2010Geneva Motor Show. Later that year, the concept received the Red Dot Design Award, after being chosen from 12,000 submissions from 60 countries.

References

External links

Flextreme GT E
Rear-wheel-drive vehicles
Cars introduced in 2010
Grand tourers
Coupés